James Kirk "Runt" Newell (November 4, 1890 – January 15, 1967) was an American football and baseball player for the Auburn Tigers of Auburn University. He lettered four years in both, as well as once in each of basketball, track, and soccer.  He was inducted into the Alabama Sports Hall of Fame in 1994.

Early years
Kirk Newell was born on November 4, 1890 in Dadeville, Alabama to James Wesley Newell and Mary Ella Wise.

Auburn University
Newell was a prominent member of Mike Donahue's football teams which over his four years from 1910 to 1913, accumulating a win–loss–tie record of 24–4–2 and outscored opponents 639 to 111. He was a member of an All-time Auburn Tigers football team selected in 1935, put at quarterback, as well as on coach Donahue's all-time Auburn team.  At Auburn, he was a member of Pi Kappa Alpha. He was nominated though not selected for an Associated Press All-Time Southeast 1869-1919 era team.

1913
He was captain of the Southern Intercollegiate Athletic Association (SIAA) champion 1913 team. which has been selected as a national champion by various selectors retroactively. Newell gained 1,707 yards that year, 46% of the team's entire offensive output; and 5,800 yards rushing, 350 yards receiving, and 1,200 yards on punt returns for his career.  One writer claims "Auburn had a lot of great football teams, but there may not have been one greater than the 1913-1914 team."

1920
Newell later coached on the Auburn football team upon graduation, and for a short time in the 1920s.

First World War
Newell received the Distinguished Service Award for his service in the First World War. According to David Housel, while in France Newell laid on top of a hand grenade set to explode on a group of people he knew, taking the brunt of the explosion himself. Newell was severely wounded after the act of selflessness. 36 pieces of scrap iron were removed from his body.

He also played football during the war, as the quarterback on the Camp Gordon team in 1917.

References

External links
 Alabama Sports Hall of Fame profile

1890 births
1967 deaths
American football halfbacks
American men's basketball players
Association footballers not categorized by position
Auburn Tigers football players
Camp Gordon football players
Auburn Tigers baseball players
Auburn Tigers football coaches
Auburn Tigers men's basketball players
Auburn Tigers men's soccer players
Auburn Tigers men's track and field athletes
All-Southern college football players
People from Tallapoosa County, Alabama
Coaches of American football from Alabama
Players of American football from Alabama
Baseball players from Alabama
Basketball players from Alabama
Soccer players from Alabama
Track and field athletes from Alabama
Association football players not categorized by nationality